The Samburu National Reserve is a game reserve on the banks of the Ewaso Ng'iro river in Kenya. On the other side of the river is the Buffalo Springs National Reserve. The park is 165 km² in size and is situated 350 kilometers from Nairobi. It ranges in altitude from 800 to 1230 m above sea level. Geographically, it is located in Samburu County.

In the middle of the reserve, the Ewaso Ng'iro flows through doum palm groves and thick riverine forests. It provides water, without which the game in this arid region could not survive.

The Samburu National Reserve was one of the two areas in which conservationists George and Joy Adamson raised Elsa the Lioness, made famous in the best-selling book and award-winning movie Born Free. The Elephant Watch Camp, of which Saba Douglas-Hamilton is director, lies within the park.

The Samburu National Reserve is also the home of Kamunyak, a lioness famous for adopting oryx calves.

Habitat
Samburu National Reserve can be entered via the Ngare Mare and Buffalo Springs gates. Once inside the reserve, there are two mountains visible: Koitogor and Ololokwe. Samburu National Reserve is very peaceful and attracts animals because of the Ewaso Ng'iro river (meaning "brown water" and pronounced U-aa-so-Nyee-ro) that runs through it and the mixture of acacia, riverine forest, thorn trees and grassland vegetation. The Ewaso Ng'iro flows from the Kenyan highlands and empties into the famous Lorian Swamp. The natural serenity that is evident here is due to its distance from industry and the inaccessibility of the reserve for many years.

Wildlife

There is a wide variety of animal and bird life seen at Samburu National Reserve. Several large game species common to Kenya's northern plains can be found in abundance here, including the following dry-country fauna: gerenuk, Grevy's zebra, oryx and reticulated giraffe. All three big cats, the lion, cheetah and African leopard can also be found here, as well as the elephant, Cape buffalo and hippopotamus.

Other mammals frequently seen in the park include olive baboon, warthogs, Grant's gazelle, Kirk's dik-dik, impala, and waterbuck. A black rhinoceros population has been re-introduced into the park after an absence of 25 years  due to heavy poaching.

There are over 350 species of bird. These include grey-headed kingfisher, sunbirds, bee-eaters, Marabou stork, tawny eagle, Verreaux's eagle, bateleur, vulturine guineafowl, yellow-necked spurfowl, lilac-breasted roller, secretary bird, superb starling, northern red-billed hornbill, yellow-billed hornbill, and various vultures including the palm-nut vulture.

The Ewaso Ng'iro river contains large numbers of Nile crocodile basks.

Since 2005, the protected area is considered part of a Lion Conservation Unit.

Gallery

See also
Samburu Airport
Samburu County
Samburu language
Samburu people

References

External links

 Official website

 
Samburu County
Protected areas of Kenya
Great Rift Valley
Protected areas established in 1985
Geography of Rift Valley Province
Tourist attractions in Rift Valley Province
1985 establishments in Kenya
Northern Acacia-Commiphora bushlands and thickets